Pelatachina is a genus of flies in the family Tachinidae.

Species
P. limata Coquillett, 1902
P. orillia Curran, 1927
P. pellucida Coquillett, 1897
P. tibialis (Fallén, 1810)

References

Tachininae
Tachinidae genera